All of the 3 Nebraska incumbents were re-elected.

See also 
 List of United States representatives from Nebraska
 United States House of Representatives elections, 1972

1972
Nebraska
1972 Nebraska elections